All Work, No Play is Public Announcement's second studio album and first album without singer R. Kelly. Released on March 24, 1998, the album features the hit single, "Body Bumpin' (Yippie-Yi-Yo)", which charted at number five on the Billboard Hot 100.

Track listing

Credits and personnel
Credits adapted from AllMusic.

 Timmy Allen – Programming
 Lemoyne Alexander – Guitar, Keyboards
 Steve B. – Mixing Assistant
 Chris Bauer – Engineer
 Craig Bayer – Engineer
 Rufus Blaq – Guest Artist, Rap
 Ian Boxill – Engineer
 Vernon Bullock – Composer
 Feloney Davis – Arranger, Composer, Unknown Contributor Role, Vocals
 Charles "Chip" Dubose – Guitar
 Mike Dunn – Arranger, Engineer, Mixing, Producer, Programming
 Leroy Edward – Guitar
 Cleveland Fields – Keyboards, Producer, Programming, Strings
 Frank Fitzpatrick – Producer
 Flawless – Vocals
 Dan Garcia – Engineer
 Larimie Garcia – Design
 Brian Gardner – Mastering
 Jim Godsey – Engineer
 Euclid Gray – Arranger, Composer, Unknown Contributor Role, Vocals
 Monica Gray – Composer
 Ron Hall – Bass
 Tracy Hogan – Vocals
 Mikael Ifversen – Engineer
 Steve Johnson – Assistant Engineer, Mixing Assistant
 Booker T. Jones III – Mixing
 Kelly G. – Drum Programming
 Michael Lavine – Photography
 Lele – Vocals
 Ron Lew – Mixing Assistant
 Life – Vocals
 Tatiana Litvin – Vocals

 Ron Lowe – Mixing Assistant
 M-Doc – Drum Programming, Keyboards, Producer
 Bill Meyers – String Arrangements
 Peter Mokran – Mixing
 Matt Molina – Assistant Engineer, Mixing Assistant
 Robert "Rob Dog" Morrison – Keyboards
 Shaquille O'Neal – Guest Artist, Rap
 Felton C. Pilate II – Composer
 Carl Potts – Guitar (Acoustic), Guitar (Electric)
 Travon Potts – Arranger, Composer, Producer, Vocal Arrangement
 Matt Prock – Assistant Engineer, Guitar (Acoustic), Mixing Assistant
 Public Announcement – Arranger, Primary Artist, Vocals, Vocals (Background)
 Henley Regisford – Executive Producer
 Henley Regisford, Jr. – Executive Producer
 Unohoo Regisford – Executive Producer
 Earl Robinson – Arranger, Composer, Drum Programming, Keyboards, Producer, Programming, Unknown Contributor Role, Vocals
 Roger – Guest Artist, Performer, Primary Artist, Vocals
 Greg Ross – Art Direction, Design
 Michael Angelo Saulsberry – Producer
 Oscar Seaton – Drums
 Eric Sexton – Associate Executive Producer, Associate Producer
 Soul Children of Chicago – Guest Artist, Vocals
 Martin Stebbing – Engineer, Mixing
 Unohoo – Arranger, Executive Producer
 Mingo Valentino – Rap, Vocals
 Steve Weeder – Engineer, mixing
 Walt Whitman – Guest artist, vocals
 Glenn Wright – Arranger, vocals

Charts

Weekly charts

Year-end charts

References

External links
 
 

1998 albums
Public Announcement albums